Mohammed Saleem is an environmental activist, environmental campaigner, National Geographic educator and explorer. He is the co-founder of Environment Conservation Group, a nonprofit NGO based out of Coimbatore, Tamilnadu that works on environmental conservation, advocacy and educational awareness. He has dedicated his entire life to the cause of environmental and wildlife conservation. He is also an ardent birder.

Early life and education
Mohammed Saleem was born in Coimbatore and is the youngest son of Rahamathulla and Saina. Saleem  did his schooling at Carmel Garden Matriculation Higher Secondary School. He completed his bachelor's in computer science in RVS college of Arts and Science. He was actively involved in environmental activities right from his college days as student coordinator of Tahr Span Nature club. An avid learner he has attended various courses on environment, wildlife, including Disaster Preparedness from University of Pittsburgh, Psychological First Aid from Johns Hopkins University, Health Effect of Climate Change from Harvard University, Ecosystem Services: A Method for sustainable development from University of Geneva to name a few.  He is also trained in Basic Life Support from PSG Institute of Medical Sciences & Research.

Wildlife rescue
Saleem has undertaken multiple rescue operations leading to seizure of hundreds of wild animals from illegal hunters and pet vendors and is also instrumental in eliminating hundreds of snares meant to trap wild animals. He has been recognised by Wildlife Crime Control Bureau among its first batch of volunteers in India.

Environment conservation
An environmental activist; Saleem has raised his voice to save trees, animals and wetlands. His work have been covered in various media including All India Radio, ANI, Arunachal Times, BBC News, Ceylon News, Dainik Bhaskar, Deccan Chronicle, Dhaka Courier, Dinamani, Dinakaran,  Dinamalar, Dinathanthi, Divya Bhaskar, Doordarshan, DT Next, Eastern Mirror Nagaland, Enadu, India Today, Kalaignar TV, Koodu, Kutch Mitra, Makkal TV, Malaimurasu, Malayalam Manorama, Mint Lounge, NDTV,  News7, News18, Northeast Today, Puthiyathalaimurai, Radio City,  Radio Mirchi, Rajasthan Patrika, Sakshi, Sanctuary Asia, South China Morning Post, Simplicity, Sun TV, Suryan FM,  The Hindu, Thejas News, The New Indian Express, The Times of India, United News of Bangladesh and Vikatan.

Education and awareness
A National Geographic educator and coordinator of Kids for Tigers he has been very active in spreading awareness to younger generations. He has been invited to various schools from Tribal school in Sundarbans to the prestigious Doon School. He was also invited to talk to students at Tribhuvan University - Kathmandu, Wild Team- Dhaka to name a few. Saleem has also conducted sessions for Forest officers across the country. He received the Guinness World Record certificate for his role in " The largest Recycling lesson" along with Coimbatore City Municipal Corporation in the year 2015.

SEEK expeditions
Saleem led four expeditions covering all 28 states of India and neighbouring countries Nepal, Bhutan and Bangladesh. The team visited various wildlife scantuaries and national parks documenting roadkills, endangered animals and India's rich natural heritage. During the expeditions the team also visited various educational institutions to spread awareness on the importance of saving wildlife and their natural habitats. The team was also successful in documenting some of India's most threatened animals.

Natural disaster relief programs
Saleem has been very active along with his Environment Conservation Group team during time of climate disasters such as 2018 Kerala floods and Tamil Nadu floods of 2015 South India floods. He and his team spent days at Cuddalore providing relief to the people worst affected by the unprecedented floods. His selfless service during the floods earned him the Real Hero Award from Coimbatore City Municipal Corporation in the year 2015.

Save racecourse
Mohammed Saleem was instrumental in highlighting the issue of Coimbatore Racecourse, he led a mass movement which was successful in persuading the Coimbatore Corporation to give up the building of unwanted structures in a racecourse at the cost of the environment.

Awards and recognition
 Member - IUCN Commission on Education and Communication 2021-2025
 Grantee - National Geographic Society - 2021
 Distinguished Alumni Award- RVS College of Arts & Science - 2018
 National Geographic Educator – 2018
 Executive Member – Govt. Polytechnic College for Women – 2018
 Mitafest Awards - Madras Institute of Technology - 2017
 Wildlife Crime Control Bureau Volunteer - 2016
 Brand ambassador for Swachh Bharat Mission - Coimbatore, since 2016
 "Nature's Bodyguard" Times of India, February 2015.
 Coimbatore City Municipal Corporation- Real Hero Award 2015
 Board Member -Centre for Counselling and Guidance – Sree Saraswathi Thyagaraja College, Pollachi, 2014 –
 British Council RAAC ABS ECO Awards - 2014
 "Jumbo man of the jungle" Deccan Chronicle, June 2014.
 "The Good Earth" The Hindu, August 2013
 "Top ten magnificent tiger defenders of India" Sanctuary Asia, August 2013.

References 

Living people
Indian conservationists
Nature conservation in India
Year of birth missing (living people)
Indian environmentalists
People from Coimbatore
Activists from Tamil Nadu
Indian activists